The Midwest MU-1 was an American single-seat, high-wing, strut-braced utility glider that was designed by Arthur B. Schultz in the 1930s.

Design and development
The MU-1 was designed by Schultz prior to the Second World War and was used by the United States Army Air Corps for glider training and designated as the Midwest TG-18.

The MU-1 was constructed with a welded steel tube fuselage and a wooden-framed wings, all covered in doped aircraft fabric covering. The wing was of  span, employed a NACA 4412 airfoil and was supported by two parallel struts with jury struts. Landing gear was a fixed monowheel.

The aircraft was type certified on 13 October 1944 and about six were completed by Midwest Sailplane and possibly also by the Motorless Flight Institute of Chicago, Illinois.

Operational history
In 1983 Soaring Magazine reported that two MU-1s were still in existence, but in October 2015 only one was on the Federal Aviation Administration registry.

Variants
MU-1
Standard model with  wingspan and  wing area
MU-1 long-wing
Version with a longer span, double-tapered wing of similar wing area. This model may have been a proposal only as completed examples have not been confirmed.
Schultz ABC
Developed from the MU-1, the ABC has a longer wingspan and higher glide ratio. It won the 1937 Eaton Design Competition
TG-18Military designation for impressed MU-1 gliders used for glider pilot training.

Operators

Military
United States Army Air Corps

Specifications (MU-1)

See also

References

External links
NACA 4412 airfoil

1930s United States sailplanes